The 2017 NCAA Division I men's ice hockey tournament was the national championship tournament for men's college ice hockey in the United States, held from March 24 - April 8, 2017. The tournament involved 16 teams in single-elimination play to determine the national champion at the Division I level of the National Collegiate Athletic Association (NCAA), the highest level of competition in college hockey. The tournament's Frozen Four – the semifinals and finals – was hosted by the University of Notre Dame and the Chicago Sports Commission at the United Center in Chicago.

Denver defeated Minnesota-Duluth 3–2 to win the program's 8th NCAA title.

Tournament procedure

The tournament is composed of four groups of four teams in regional brackets.  The four regionals are officially named after their geographic areas.  The following were the sites for the 2017 regionals:
March 24–25
East Regional, Dunkin' Donuts Center – Providence, Rhode Island (Host: Brown University)
West Regional, Scheels Arena – Fargo, North Dakota (Host: University of North Dakota)
March 25–26
Northeast Regional, SNHU Arena – Manchester, New Hampshire (Host: University of New Hampshire)
Midwest Regional, US Bank Arena – Cincinnati, Ohio (Host: Miami University)

The winner of each regional advanced to the Frozen Four:
April 6–8
United Center – Chicago, Illinois (Host: University of Notre Dame)

Qualifying teams
The at-large bids and seeding for each team in the tournament were announced on March 19. Hockey East had four teams receive a berth in the tournament, NCHC had four teams receive a berth, ECAC Hockey had three teams receive a berth, Big Ten Conference had three teams receive a berth,  and one team from the Atlantic Hockey, and the Western Collegiate Hockey Association (WCHA) received a berth.

Number in parentheses denotes overall seed in the tournament.

Tournament bracket

Note: * denotes overtime period

Results

Midwest Region – Cincinnati, Ohio

Regional semifinal

Regional Final

West Region – Fargo, North Dakota

Regional semifinal

Regional Final

East Region – Providence, Rhode Island

Regional semifinal

Regional Final

Northeast Region – Manchester, New Hampshire

Regional semifinal

Regional Final

Frozen Four – Chicago, Illinois

National semifinal

National Championship

(MW1) Denver vs. (W1) Minnesota–Duluth

All-Tournament team

Frozen Four
G: Tanner Jaillet (Denver)
D: Will Butcher (Denver)
D: Neal Pionk (Minnesota-Duluth)
F: Alex Iafallo (Minnesota-Duluth)
F: Jarid Lukosevicius* (Denver)
F: Troy Terry (Denver)
* Most Outstanding Player(s)

Record by conference

Media

Television
ESPN had US television rights to all games during the tournament for the thirteenth consecutive year. ESPN aired every game, beginning with the regionals, on ESPN, ESPN2, ESPNews, ESPNU, or ESPN3 and streamed them online via WatchESPN.

In Canada, the tournament was broadcast by TSN and streamed on TSN Go.

Broadcast assignments
Regionals
East Regional: John Buccigross, Barry Melrose and Quint Kessenich – Providence, Rhode Island
West Regional: Clay Matvick and Sean Ritchlin – Fargo, North Dakota
Northeast Regional: Allen Bestwick and Billy Jaffe – Manchester, New Hampshire
Midwest Regional: Kevin Brown and Colby Cohen – Cincinnati, Ohio

Frozen Four
John Buccigross, Barry Melrose and Quint Kessenich – Chicago, Illinois

Radio
Westwood One has exclusive radio rights to the Frozen Four and will air both the semifinals and the championship.
Alex Faust, Colby Cohen, & Shireen Saski

References

Tournament
NCAA Division I men's ice hockey tournament
NCAA Division I men's ice hockey tournament
NCAA Division I men's ice hockey tournament
NCAA Division I men's ice hockey tournament
NCAA Division I men's ice hockey tournament
NCAA Division I men's ice hockey tournament
NCAA Division I men's ice hockey tournament
NCAA Division I men's ice hockey tournament
2010s in Chicago
2010s in Cincinnati
History of Providence, Rhode Island
Ice hockey competitions in Chicago
Ice hockey competitions in Cincinnati
Ice hockey competitions in New Hampshire
Ice hockey competitions in North Dakota
Ice hockey competitions in Rhode Island
Sports in Fargo, North Dakota
Sports in Manchester, New Hampshire
Sports in Providence, Rhode Island